Eulimastoma eutropia is a species of sea snail, a marine gastropod mollusk in the family Pyramidellidae, the pyrams and their allies.

Description
The length of the shell varies between 2.5 mm and 4.3 mm.

Distribution
This marine species occurs of Southeast Asia and the Philippines.

References

External links
 To World Register of Marine Species
 

Pyramidellidae
Gastropods described in 1899